The women's shot put events were held on each day of the 2021 World Para Athletics European Championships in Bydgoszcz, Poland.

Medalists

See also
List of IPC world records in athletics

References

Shot put
2021 in women's athletics
Shot put at the World Para Athletics European Championships